Jing is a concept in Chinese philosophy which is typically translated as "reverence". It is often used by Confucius in the term , meaning "respectful reverence". For Confucians,  requires , or righteousness, and a proper observation of rituals.

The Confucian notion of respect has been likened to the later, western Kantian notion.

References

Bibliography 

 
 
 

Chinese philosophy
Virtue
Confucian ethics
Filial piety
Concepts in Chinese philosophy